Terry Cole (July 7, 1945 – November 11, 2005) was an American football running back who played professionally in the National Football League.

High school and college career
He started his career at Mitchell High School, where he was named to the All-State team in both his junior and  senior years, earning All-American honors his senior year. Cole went on to play at Indiana University, where he started at fullback his sophomore, junior, and senior years. In 1967, he was named MVP of the annual Old Oaken Bucket game against Purdue University, rushing for 155 yards and one touchdown.

Professional football career
Cole played six seasons for the Baltimore Colts, the Pittsburgh Steelers, and the Miami Dolphins, as well as in the World Football League with the Houston Texans/Shreveport Steamer. Highlights of his pro football career include three Super Bowl appearances and was the runner-up for the 1968 rookie of the year award.

After his NFL career, Cole started several small businesses and was president of Cole-Chem, a diversified specialty chemical company. Cole was inducted into the Indiana Football Hall of Fame in 1992 and received the Zora Clevenger award in 2005, the highest honor given to a former IU athlete. In September 2000 the Mitchell High School (Indiana) football field was officially renamed Terry Cole Field.

Cole died on November 11, 2005 of cancer.

References

1945 births
2005 deaths
Players of American football from Dallas
American football running backs
Indiana Hoosiers football players
Baltimore Colts players
Pittsburgh Steelers players
Miami Dolphins players